Nicolás Correa Risso (born December 25, 1983 in Montevideo) is a Uruguayan footballer who is currently playing for Universidad de Concepción.

External links
 Profile at BDFA 
 

1983 births
Living people
Uruguayan footballers
Uruguayan expatriate footballers
Uruguayan Primera División players
Argentine Primera División players
Chilean Primera División players
Primera Nacional players
Liverpool F.C. (Montevideo) players
Unión de Santa Fe footballers
Defensor Sporting players
Arsenal de Sarandí footballers
C.A. Cerro players
Gimnasia y Esgrima de Jujuy footballers
Central Córdoba de Santiago del Estero footballers
Universidad de Concepción footballers
Expatriate footballers in Chile
Expatriate footballers in Argentina
Association football defenders